PDLC may refer to:

 Peterborough and District Labour Council, the central body of union locals in Peterborough County, Ontario, Canada
 Polymer dispersed liquid crystals, also known as Smart glass
 Premium downloadable content, see Proper Games

See also
 Controller–pilot data link communications (CPDLC), used by air traffic controllers to communicate with pilots